Dinoshark is a 2010 low budget Syfy horror film. It was shown on Syfy on March 13, 2010.

Background
The film premiered on Syfy on the evening of March 13, 2010 before 2 million viewers. Dinoshark followed up Dinocroc; Roger Corman proposed a sequel (Dinocroc 2) but Syfy felt that television audiences tended to respond better to new-but-similar ideas more than direct sequels. April MacIntyre, of Monsters and Critics, compared the film to old B movies. A sequel titled Dinocroc vs. Supergator was released on June 26, 2010. Roger Corman said that while the plot is hard to believe, the film can be enjoyed if belief is suspended and that the film is internally consistent.

The film is a remake of the 1979 film Up from the Depths.

Dinoshark has been described as Dinocroc with flippers. Before the film was released, Margaret Lyons of Entertainment Weekly said that this, along with Sharktopus, were destined to be classics of the "awesomely awful made-for-TV movie genre".

Plot 
The film opens with a baby pliosaur swimming away from a broken chunk of Arctic glacier that calved due to global warming. Three years later, it is a ferocious predatory adult and kills tourists and locals offshore from Puerto Vallarta, Mexico. The protagonist, Trace, is first to notice the pliosaur and witnesses his friend get eaten, but has trouble convincing people that a creature of such antiquity is still alive and eating people.

Cast
 Eric Balfour as Trace McGraw
 Iva Hasperger as Carol Brubaker
 Aarón Díaz as Luis
 Roger Corman as Dr. Reeves
 Blythe Metz as Newscaster 
 Vela Hammond as Mag
 Blanche Wheeler as Dani
 Shaun Carson as David
 Jenna Manger as Ali

Reception
Critics and reviewers tended to share similar views on the nature of the film, seeing it as a continuation in the tradition of older B movie horror/monster films, with the implausible plots, stock sequences and questionable acting typical of that genre.

Critics were divided between those who felt this made it highly entertaining and those who felt this made the film exceptionally poor in quality and panned it for its lack of redeeming features. In both cases though, critics conceded that it stood a chance of becoming a classic of its kind, if for nothing else than for a level of awfulness that mandated watching. April Macintyre of Monsters and critics gave it a positive review. Referring to "fun films, laced with implausible plots, brilliant poster art and laughable dialogue [that] demanded that you show up ready to suspend disbelief, prepare for a scare and always left the audience entertained", she wrote that some aspects are "hilariously over the top. Think Al Pacino's Cuban accent in Scarface times ten", but concluded that in the context of its genre, "we wouldn't want it any other way".

On the negative side, Dread Central was condemnatory of the "rubbery" monster, "exceptionally chintzy" effects, and "some of the worst acting ever seen in a Syfy original movie", concluding that users who did not regularly watch "schlocky shark flicks" would probably enjoy laughing at "this silly offering in which half the cast sound like they were voiced over by George Lopez". Chicago Now gave it one star out of 5 as a "low-budget joker" and "cheesy, mindless fun", stating there had to be a "fun drinking game" in it and the best thing about it was the title.

Home video
Dinoshark was released on DVD and Blu-ray on April 26, 2011.

See also
 List of killer shark films

References

External links

 Official website
 
 

2010 television films
2010 films
2010 horror films
Syfy original films
American natural horror films
Films about dinosaurs
Films about sharks
Shark attacks in fiction
Films about shark attacks
Films produced by Roger Corman
Films produced by Julie Corman
American monster movies
Giant monster films
2010s monster movies
American horror television films
2010s English-language films
Films set in Mexico
Films directed by Kevin O'Neill (director)
2010s American films